The Gelocidae are an extinct group of hornless ruminantia that are estimated to have lived during the Eocene and Oligocene epochs, from 36 MYA to 6 MYA. The family generally includes extinct hornless ruminants which do not belong to similar families such as Moschidae (musk deer) or Tragulidae. Fossils of family Gelocidae have been discovered in Europe, Asia, Africa, and North America.

Description 
Members of the family Gelocidae were long-legged, even-toed ungulates adapted for running and grazing. The Gelocidae likely share a close common ancestor with Moschidae and were of a similar size and shape. They had similar dentition and proportions to members of Moschidae, but lacked the sabre-like tusks of the modern musk deer.

Bibliography 

Pecora
Prehistoric mammal families